GCI may refer to:

Education
 Galt Collegiate Institute, in Cambridge, Ontario, Canada
 Glebe Collegiate Institute, in Ottawa, Ontario, Canada
 Global Change Institute, at the University of the Witwatersrand, Johannesburg, South Africa
 Global Cinematography Institute, in Los Angeles, California, United States
 Government College Ikorodu, in Lagos State, Nigeria

Environmentalism 
 Glen Canyon Institute, in Utah, United States
 Green Cross International, an International environmental organization
 Green Campus Initiative (UCT), a student organization at the University of Cape Town

Science, medicine and technology
 GCI (company), an American telecommunications company
 Gaussian correlation inequality
 Generalized conversational implicature
 Geomagnetically induced current
 Glial cytoplasmic inclusions, a type of abnormal protein deposit in the brain
 Google Code-in, an annual programming contest
 Ground-controlled interception

Transportation
 Guernsey Airport, in the Channel Islands
 GCI coach, the staple of Belgian passenger rail traffic in the steam era

Other uses
 International Conference on the Situation in Venezuela (Spanish: Grupo de Contacto Internacional)
 First Geneva Convention
 Gannett Company, an American newspaper publisher
 Getty Conservation Institute, an American art conservation organization
 Global Competitiveness Index
 Grace Communion International, a Christian denomination
 Grassroots Campaigns, Inc., an American political consulting organization
 Great Coasters International, an American roller coaster builder
 Great Commission International, an American religious organization